Bradyodonti is an order of cartilaginous fishes (class Chondrichthyes) that lived in the Paleozoic Era.  They first appeared toward the end of the Devonian Period, were present through the Carboniferous Period, and became extinct by the end of the Permian Period.

Most Bradyodonti fossils consist of jaws and teeth.  These indicate that Bradyodonti ate mollusks and other shelled invertebrates.  Their bodies were probably broad and flattened, like modern rays.

"Bradyodonti" can also refer to the present-day Chimaera or ratfish of the order Chimaeriformes, which have an upper jaw fused to the braincase and a flap of skin covering the gill slits.

External links
 McGraw-Hill Science Encyclopedia summary
 University of California Museum of Paleontology entry It is also a very unknown species from long ago. For more info please go to ANY Paleontologists notes and or studies.

Devonian cartilaginous fish
Carboniferous cartilaginous fish
Permian cartilaginous fish
Chimaeriformes
Prehistoric cartilaginous fish orders
Late Devonian first appearances
Late Devonian taxonomic orders
Mississippian taxonomic orders
Pennsylvanian taxonomic orders
Cisuralian taxonomic orders
Permian extinctions